The futsal competitions at the 2017 Southeast Asian Games in Kuala Lumpur took place at Panasonic Stadium in Shah Alam.

The 2017 Games featured competitions in two events.

Competition schedule
The following was the competition schedule for the futsal competitions:

Participation

Participating nations

Men's competition

Women's competition

Medal summary

Medal table

Medalists

References

External links